JJ Christdoss is an Anglican bishop in the Church of South India: he has been Bishop of Tirunelveli since 2009.

Christdoss was born on  31 March 1953 at Korampallam. He was educated at Tamil Nadu Theological Seminary. Christdoss was ordained as Deacon in 1986;and priest in  1987. He is married with three daughters.

References

Anglican bishops of Tinnevelly
Living people
Tamil Nadu Theological Seminary alumni
21st-century Anglican bishops
1953 births
People from Thoothukudi district